is a railway station in the city of Shimoda, Shizuoka, Japan, operated by the private railway operator Izukyū Corporation.

Lines

Station layout
Izukyū-Shimoda Station has a double bay platform serving three tracks. Tracks 1 and 3 are used for normal train service, and Track 2 is used by the limited express Odoriko and Saphir ODORIKO. The station has a staffed ticket office.

Platforms

Adjacent stations

History 
Izukyū-Shimoda Station opened on December 10, 1961.

Passenger statistics
In fiscal 2017, the station was used by an average of 1619 passengers daily (boarding passengers only).

Surrounding area
Shimoda Elementary School
Shimoda Middle School
Shimoda City Hall

See also
 List of Railway Stations in Japan

References

External links

official home page.

Railway stations in Shizuoka Prefecture
Izu Kyūkō Line
Railway stations in Japan opened in 1961
Stations of Izu Kyūkō
Shimoda, Shizuoka